George Bubb Dodington, 1st Baron Melcombe  (1691 – 28 July 1762) was an English Whig politician who sat in the House of Commons from 1715 to 1761.

Christened George Bubb, he was the eldest son of Jeremiah Bubb of Foy, Herefordshire and his wife Mary Dodington, daughter of John Dodington of Dodington, Somerset. His father died in 1696 and he was taken under the care of his uncle George Dodington. He was educated at Winchester College in 1703 and matriculated at Exeter College, Oxford on 10 July 1707 aged 16. He was admitted at Lincoln's Inn in 1711 and undertook a Grand Tour from 1711 to 1713.

Bubb was returned as Member of Parliament for Winchelsea at the 1715 British general election. He was sent as envoy to Spain from 1715 to 1717. He changed his surname to Dodington by Act of Parliament in 1717. In 1720 he was appointed Clerk of the Pells for Ireland for life. His uncle died in 1720 and left him his estate. He was Lord Lieutenant of Somerset from 1721 to 1744. At the 1722 British general election he was returned as MP for Bridgwater.  He was taken up by Walpole, who made him a Lord of the Treasury in 1724. He addressed an adulatory verse letter to Walpole in 1726, in which he praised loyalty as the supreme political virtue. He married Katherine Behan in secret, some time around 1725.  He was returned again for Bridgwater at the 1727 British general election. Enormously rich, he became a friend of Frederick, Prince of Wales, who took advantage of their acquaintance to obtain loans that helped clear his debts, and, on being thrown out of St James's Palace by his father, King George II, moved into a London house belonging to Dodington.

Dodington was returned for Bridgwater again in 1734 when he was also returned for Melcombe Regis, and in 1741 when he was also returned for Appleby, choosing to remain at Bridgewater on both occasions. He was appointed Treasurer of the Navy in 1744 and became Privy Councillor on 3 January 1745. He was returned again for Bridgwater in 1747 and was treasurer of the chamber to the Prince of Wales from 1749 to 1751.

At the 1754 British general election, Dodington was returned for Melcombe Regis. He was Treasurer of the Navy again from December 1755 to November 1756. He was created Baron Melcombe on 6 April 1761.

Dodington had many contacts with artists and was a collector, purchasing antiquities via Cardinal Albani in Rome. His house at Hammersmith, known as 'La Trappe' (an ironic reference to a Trappist monastery) was the focus of a lively political and cultural salon of supporters of Frederick, Prince of Wales whose palace at Kew was located just across the river. It was designed by the neo-Palladian architect Roger Morris who had been connected with the circle of Lord Burlington and the sculpture gallery was designed by the Italian architect and firework display designer Giovanni Niccolo Servandoni. Dodington is said to have been involved in a spy-ring, collecting valuable information about Jacobite activities.  In 1761, following the accession of Frederick's son to the throne as George III, he was created Baron Melcombe.

Historian N.A.M. Rodger describes Dodington as an "indefatigable schemer" on behalf of his friends and interests of the time. Dodington is depicted in William Hogarth's 1761 engraving Five Orders of Periwigs; his diary was published posthumously in 1784 by Henry Penruddocke Wyndham.

References

External links

George Bubb Dodington at the Eighteenth-Century Poetry Archive (ECPA)

|-

1691 births
1762 deaths
English diarists
Barons in the Peerage of Great Britain
Peers of Great Britain created by George III
Lord-Lieutenants of Somerset
Members of the Parliament of Great Britain for English constituencies
Members of the Privy Council of Great Britain
British MPs 1715–1722
British MPs 1722–1727
British MPs 1727–1734
British MPs 1734–1741
British MPs 1741–1747
British MPs 1747–1754
British MPs 1754–1761
Ambassadors of Great Britain to Spain
18th-century diarists